Kingsley Halt was a railway station on the Bordon Light Railway which served the village of Kingsley. The station had been constructed by the London and South Western Railway (LSWR) in the hope that the area would attract residential development, but in the event this never materialised. The LSWR had purchased an area of land far larger than that which was actually used, as they hoped to construct a large station and goods yard. A primitive halt with a single platform opened some months after the line's opening, consisting merely of a nameboard, noticeboard, lamp and seat.

Declining passenger traffic and reduced military activities at Bordon after the Second World War saw the line's closure to regular services in 1957. Kingsley Halt was demolished soon after closure and nothing now remains except the shape of the trackbed which is now used as a farm track.

See also 

 List of closed railway stations in Britain

References

External links 
 Kingsley Halt on Subterranea Britannica

Disused railway stations in Hampshire
Former London and South Western Railway stations
Railway stations in Great Britain opened in 1906
Railway stations in Great Britain closed in 1957